2,6-Dichloroaniline is an organic compound with the formula C6H3Cl2(NH2).  It is one of several isomers of dichloroaniline.  It is a colorless or white solid. Derivatives include the drugs clonidine and diclofenac.

Preparation
It is produced by hydrogenation of 2,6-dichloronitrobenzene.

In the laboratory, it can be prepared by halogenation of sulfanilamide followed by desulfonation.

References

Anilines